Juvenal Correia Leal is a São Tomé and Príncipe professional football manager. Until 1998 he coached the São Tomé and Príncipe national football team. Later, he worked as a President of Santana FC.

References

Year of birth missing (living people)
Living people
São Tomé and Príncipe football managers
São Tomé and Príncipe national football team managers
Place of birth missing (living people)